is a Japanese table tennis player and coach. She was born in Tomakomai, Hokkaido. She competed in women's singles and women's doubles at the 2004 Summer Olympics in Athens.

References

External links

1976 births
Living people
People from Tomakomai, Hokkaido
Sportspeople from Hokkaido
Japanese female table tennis players
Olympic table tennis players of Japan
Table tennis players at the 2004 Summer Olympics
Japanese table tennis coaches
Asian Games medalists in table tennis
Table tennis players at the 2002 Asian Games
Asian Games bronze medalists for Japan
Medalists at the 2002 Asian Games